The EMD SD90MAC is a model of  C-C diesel-electric locomotive produced by General Motors Electro-Motive Division. It is, with the SD80MAC, one of the largest single-engined locomotives produced by EMD, surpassed only by the dual-engined DDA40X.

The SD9043MAC is the  variant, using a 16-cylinder 710G engine instead of the H-engine, which was originally intended as a temporary alternative while EMD tried to solve the H-engine's issues. However, the accompanying upgrade program was never utilized by its customers.

The SD90MAC's features include radial steering trucks with AC traction motors and an isolated safety cab which is mounted on shock absorbers to lessen vibrations in the cab.  The SD90MAC, like the SD80MAC, SD70ACe, and SD70M-2, has a wide radiator section, nearly the entire width of the locomotive, which along with their size makes them easy to spot.

As of 2019, some SD90MACs are still in service on the Union Pacific. Norfolk Southern had rostered 110 SD90MAC locomotives purchased or traded from Union Pacific or  the CIT Group respectively, that have now all been rebuilt as EMD SD70ACU locomotives. Canadian Pacific has also opted to convert their small fleet of long-stored SD90MACs into SD70ACUs as well.

History

The SD90MAC was introduced in 1995, along with the SD80MAC locomotives.  The SD90MAC was designed to utilize the new 16-cylinder H-engine, while the SD80MAC was designed to use the 20-cylinder version of the existing 710G engine.  However, technical problems with the  engine resulted in the first locomotives being shipped with  16-cylinder 710G engines, making them similar to the SD70MAC's.  These locomotives were informally designated SD9043MAC by railroads that purchased them with the option to re-engine them with  engines when they became available.  This upgrade program, however, was never taken advantage of by SD90MAC buyers due to reliability issues with the newer engine.  Over 400 SD90MAC locomotives fitted with the  710 engine were built.

In 1996, Electro-Motive Diesel entered full production on their , 16-cylinder H-engine, and all SD90MACs made from then on used that for its prime mover. Locomotives fitted with this engine are sometimes referred to as SD90MAC-H locomotives.  Later versions of the SD90MAC-H feature a Phase II cab, with a new nose which offers higher visibility from the cab than the old nose.  The SD90MAC-H did not prove popular with railroads and less than 70 were built, including Electro-Motive Diesel demonstrator units.  Since the SD90MAC-H had such a large prime mover, it didn't offer the same operational flexibility as smaller units, limiting its possible customer base to only the largest railroads.  Also, since the H-engine was a new design it hadn't reached the same level of reliability as EMD's previous engine.  The low reliability on such a large engine was an especially bad combination since the loss of one engine in a train meant the loss of a larger percentage of pulling power than had a smaller engine failed.  In the end the SD90MAC-H was only delivered to two railroads, the Union Pacific Railroad and the Canadian Pacific Railway.  The Canadian Pacific locomotives were part of an earlier order for 710-engine equipped SD90MAC locomotives that was still in production when Electro-Motive Diesel switched over to the H-engine.

Electro-Motive Diesel also tried offering a lower-power version of the SD90MAC with a 12-cylinder engine called the SD89MAC, but none were produced other than the prototype.

Specifications

Prime mover (EMD 710):
EMD V16 710G3C-T1
Power Output - 
Idle - 200 rpm
Full Speed - 950 rpm

Prime mover (EMD 265):
EMD V16 EMD GM16V265
Power Output -  at 1,000 rpm
Idle - 200 rpm
Full speed - 1,000 rpm

Traction motors:
6 Siemens 1TB2830 AC motors mounted 3 each on 2 HTCR-2 radial self-steering trucks.
Rated output - 
Gearing - 83:16
Wheel size - 
Max revolutions - 3,435 rpm
Starting torque - 
Continuous torque - 
Maximum voltage - 2,183 V

Performance (parenthesis indicate H-Engine equipped specifications):
Maximum speed - 
Starting tractive effort -  and )
Continuous tractive effort -  and )
Braking effort - 
Weight - /

Fleet rosters
Canadian Pacific

9100-9160 (SD9043MAC): Units were at one time up for sale in "as is" condition, but no buyer was ever found. Some units had been intermittently placed into freight service to help combat motive power shortages. 30 of them will be rebuilt in 2019 as EMD SD70ACUs and renumbered 7000-7029. It was later announced that the order would be upped to 60 units in total, using the remainder of the 58 usable cores from the long-stored SD90MAC fleet and buying two SD90MACs from the Union Pacific to make up the difference. In 2021, Canadian Pacific purchased 40 more SD90MACs from Union Pacific for further continuation of the SD70ACU rebuild program.
9300-9303 (SD90MAC-H): These were scrapped in Lachine, QC. 

CEFX
100-139 (SD9043MAC) (Lease Fleet) 10 units traded to NS for 15 MP15DCs.

EMLX
8500, 8523-8561 (EMD Lease fleet), Former Union Pacific 8500, 8523-8561, currently stored. All units leased to Kansas City Southern in 2008 on one-year lease. Several to the Buffalo and Pittsburgh Railroad upon returning from KCS lease. All units currently stored. Nine were sold to Fortescue Metals Group in Western Australia. Units have since been sold to many different owners, primarily for scrap.

Indiana Rail Road
9001-9013, 9025 (SD9043MAC) (Long-term lease from CEFX).

Norfolk Southern
7229-7338 (SD9043MAC); NS purchased 100 units in September 2014 from EMD/Progress Rail. Those units are ex-UP. 10 units were acquired from CEFX in June 2016, in exchange for 15 MP15DCs. All units have been converted into SD70ACUs.

Union Pacific:
8000-8308 (SD9043MAC); most of them were renumbered 3470-3775 to make room for new GE ES44ACs. Both the Norfolk Southern and Canadian Pacific have purchased locomotives from Union Pacific's fleet for SD70ACU rebuilds, in September 2014 Norfolk Southern purchased 100 of these and in 2019 and 2021 Canadian Pacific purchased 42 of these in total.
8500-8561 (SD90MAC-H. Fleet Retired, some after less than 5 years of service. 8500, 8523-8561 to EMLX Lease fleet, 8501-8522 renumbered 8911-8931. Retired in late 2008-2009. Sold to Metro East Industries in Alorton, Illinois. Scrapped mid to late 2009)

Fortescue Metals Group
901-904 (SD90MAC-H)
905-909 (SD9043MAC):  Rebuilt from SD90MAC-H for use in Australia at the Juniata Shops
910-917 (SD90MAC-PII): Rebuilt for use in Australia at Mayfield, KY shop

Current status

As of January 2005, the SD90MAC is no longer in production due to the Environmental Protection Agency's Tier 2 locomotive emission regulations, although EMD had planned to be able to get the H-engine approved at some later date. However, China recently announced an order for 300 JT56ACe locomotives, which also use the H-Engine as its prime mover. A portion of the locomotives will be assembled in kit form by China's own Dalian Locomotive Works. These units were reportedly capable of meeting the EPA's strict regulations and began delivery in the latter half of 2007.

Due to reliability issues, FMG units 910 to 917 are stored and deemed not be used. They were purchased to be used as "slave" units, and they were more offline than they were in use. FMG is looking to fit 910-917 to the same specifications as 901-909. 916 is currently in the shops.

On 1 August 2008 Union Pacific Railroad announced that it would be retiring 21 of the SD90MAC locomotives. Common parts will be used to maintain the railroad's 710-engined SD90MAC fleet. The 265H prime mover will be cut up or exported. The only part that is not reusable is the frame. These units, in the 8900 series will be removed from storage in Denver, and be sent to East St. Louis, Ill., in small batches to be dismantled. As of 2019, Union Pacific still operates some of the remaining SD9043MACs, which sport new numbers and UP wings on the cab. These units take the original road numbers of the Union Pacific's original SD40-2 fleet.

Canadian Pacific's SD90MAC-H locomotives 9300-9303 (listed as SD90MAC6000s) were up for tendered sale in 2009. The bidding ended 31 March 2010. While they were originally thought to be shipped overseas, they were eventually moved to Quebec for scrapping.

Canadian Pacific's SD90MAC locomotives, numbered in the 9100-9160 series had been in long term storage in Winnipeg, Manitoba for much of the 2010-decade. With three units, the 9129, 9133 and 9138 being scrapped in November 2012 due to errors in preparing them for long term storage. The entire fleet had been put up for sale in November 2012 and again in January 2013 with no offers being made. These units remained stored until the Winter of 2018 when at first 30, then all 58 remaining units entered a rebuild program to be converted into SD70ACUs. In 2021 Canadian Pacific purchased 40 more SD90MACs from the Union Pacific for further rebuilding into SD70ACU engines.

In September 2014, Norfolk Southern purchased 100 4300 hp SD9043MACs from Union Pacific with the intent to rebuild them into SD70ACUs at the Juniata Shops. The last 4 SD90MACs were taken delivery to Norfolk Southern on October 3, 2015 running parallel to Western Ave in Chicago IL.

In 2015 Cummins rebuilt a single SD90MAC with its QSK95 engine, designed to meet Tier 4 emissions standards. Sygnet Rail Technologies and Brookville Equipment Corporation performed the conversion. The rebuild was designated HTL4200AC. The locomotive, numbered CECX  1919, had been Union Pacific  8559.

See also
GE AC6000CW A similarly powerful locomotive built by GE that entered production soon after the SD90MAC.
China Railways HXN3

References

C-C locomotives
Diesel-electric locomotives of the United States
Diesel locomotives of Western Australia
SD90MAC
Freight locomotives
Railway locomotives introduced in 1995
Standard gauge locomotives of the United States
SD90MAC
Standard gauge locomotives of Canada
Standard gauge locomotives of Australia
Diesel-electric locomotives of Australia
Diesel-electric locomotives of Canada